Reuf may refer to:

Reuf Bajrović, politician
Reuf Duraković, footballer
Reuf Pasha, dispatched from Constantinople to Slivna as the temporary head of the defense of the Balkans
Reuf (song)